Elixir Strings, manufactured by W. L. Gore & Associates, are strings for electric, acoustic, and bass guitars as well as banjo and mandolin.

Elixir Strings are noted for their patented fluoropolymer coating. The coating extends the strings' life and tone by reducing the accumulation of debris and blocking corrosion from elements such as skin oil.

Products
There are three types of coatings:

 Polyweb - thicker coating, longest lasting
 Nanoweb - thinner coating, feels more like a traditional string than polyweb
 Optiweb - thinnest coating, only for electric

Artists
 Eric Bibb
 Christopher Cross
 Alex De Grassi
 Roberto Diana
 Taj Farrant
 Gus G
Andy Gillion
 Johnny Hiland
 John Paul Jones
 Kaki King
 John Paul White

References

External links
 

Guitar parts and accessories